Ilya Alekseyevich Mazurov (born 7 June 1999) is a Russian football player.

Club career
He made his debut in the Russian Football National League for FC Spartak-2 Moscow on 17 July 2018 in a game against PFC Sochi.

References

External links
 Profile by Russian Football National League
 

1999 births
Sportspeople from Tashkent
Living people
Russian footballers
Russia youth international footballers
Association football midfielders
FC Spartak-2 Moscow players
FC Fakel Voronezh players
FC SKA Rostov-on-Don players
Russian First League players
Russian Second League players